Seondha is a town and a Nagar Panchayat in Datia district in the Indian state of Madhya Pradesh. A large Datia era fortress, is located along the banks of the River Sindh. City is well known for its spirituality. Seondha Municipality President "ASHA GOVIND SINGH NAGIL. it is very near to Ratangarh mandir situated only   15 km away from it.  It is believed that Four Kumaras namely Sanak, Sanandan,Sanatan and Sanatkumar are still meditating in their Child awatar. It is full of Natural Resources and very famous for its waterfall.

Geography
It has an average elevation of 152 metres (498 feet). Sun Kuwa is a famous place in Seondha because after dewali fair (mela) is conducted on purnima and people take baths in the Sindh river on this day.

Climate
Seondha experiences warm and temperate climate. In winter, there is much less rainfall than in summer. The Köppen-Geiger climate classification is Cwa. The average temperature in Seondha is 26.0 °C. The average annual rainfall is 881 mm. The driest month is April. There is 2 mm of precipitation in April. Most precipitation falls in August, with an average of 305 mm.

Demographics
 India census, Seondha had a population of 19,540. Males constitute 55% of the population and females 45%. Seondha has an average literacy rate of 60%, higher than the national average of 59.5%: male literacy is 69%, and female literacy is 49%. In Seondha, 16% of the population is under 6 years of age.

History 
Seondha, a beautiful historical town situated on the bank of river Sindh in Datia District of Madhya Pradesh. Sindh River is a tributary of River Yamuna. This river sided town having a '''legacy of spiritual, heritage and WildlifeSeondha

 Seondha(Vidhan Sabha constituency)
 Ratangarh, Datia
 Datia district

References

Datia